Abduvohid Nematov (born 20 March 2001) is an Uzbekistani footballer who plays for Nasaf and Uzbekistan national football team.

Career

International
Nematov made his debut for the Uzbekistan main team on 3 September 2020 in a Friendly match against Tajikistan.

Statistics accurate as of match played 17 November 2020.

Honours

Club
Nasaf
 Uzbekistan Super League runner-up: 2017, 2020

References

External links

2001 births
Living people
Uzbekistani footballers
Uzbekistan international footballers
FC Nasaf players
Association football goalkeepers
Uzbekistan Super League players
People from Jizzakh